Postales (Spanish "postcards") is the third studio album of singer-songwriter Gaby Moreno. The album was released on September 4, 2012 under the independent label Metamorfosis and includes 12 songs. The album was mixed and engineered by Joel Hamilton of Studio G in Brooklyn, New York.

Track listing

References 

2012 albums
Gaby Moreno albums